

Events

Pre-1600
1132 – Battle of Nocera between Ranulf II of Alife and Roger II of Sicily.
1148 – Louis VII of France lays siege to Damascus during the Second Crusade.
1304 – Wars of Scottish Independence: Fall of Stirling Castle: King Edward I of England takes the stronghold using the War Wolf.
1411 – Battle of Harlaw, one of the bloodiest battles in Scotland, takes place.
1412 – Behnam Hadloyo becomes Syriac Orthodox Patriarch of Mardin.
1487 – Citizens of Leeuwarden, Netherlands, strike against a ban on foreign beer.
1534 – French explorer Jacques Cartier plants a cross on the Gaspé Peninsula and takes possession of the territory in the name of Francis I of France.
1567 – Mary, Queen of Scots, is forced to abdicate and be replaced by her one-year-old son James VI.

1601–1900
1701 – Antoine de la Mothe Cadillac founds the trading post at Fort Pontchartrain, which later becomes the city of Detroit.
1712 – War of the Spanish Succession: The French under Marshal Villars win a decisive victory over Eugene of Savoy at Denain.
1847 – After 17 months of travel, Brigham Young leads 148 Mormon pioneers into Salt Lake Valley, resulting in the establishment of Salt Lake City.
  1847   – Richard March Hoe,  American inventor, patented the rotary-type printing press.
1864 – American Civil War: Battle of Kernstown: Confederate General Jubal Early defeats Union troops led by General George Crook in an effort to keep them out of the Shenandoah Valley.
1866 – Reconstruction: Tennessee becomes the first U.S. state to be readmitted to Congress following the American Civil War.

1901–present
1901 – O. Henry is released from prison in Columbus, Ohio, after serving three years for embezzlement from a bank.
1910 – The Ottoman Empire captures the city of Shkodër, putting down the Albanian Revolt of 1910.
1911 – Hiram Bingham III re-discovers Machu Picchu, "the Lost City of the Incas".
1915 – The passenger ship  capsizes while tied to a dock in the Chicago River. A total of 844 passengers and crew are killed in the largest loss of life disaster from a single shipwreck on the Great Lakes.
1922 – The draft of the British Mandate of Palestine was formally confirmed by the Council of the League of Nations; it came into effect on 26 September 1923.
1923 – The Treaty of Lausanne, settling the boundaries of modern Turkey, is signed in Switzerland by Greece, Bulgaria and other countries that fought in World War I.
1924 – Themistoklis Sofoulis becomes Prime Minister of Greece.
1927 – The Menin Gate war memorial is unveiled at Ypres.
1929 – The Kellogg–Briand Pact, renouncing war as an instrument of foreign policy, goes into effect (it is first signed in Paris on August 27, 1928, by most leading world powers).
1935 – The Dust Bowl heat wave reaches its peak, sending temperatures to 109 °F (43 °C) in Chicago and 104 °F (40 °C) in Milwaukee.
1943 – World War II: Operation Gomorrah begins: British and Canadian aeroplanes bomb Hamburg by night, and American planes bomb the city by day. By the end of the operation in November, 9,000 tons of explosives will have killed more than 30,000 people and destroyed 280,000 buildings.
1950 – Cape Canaveral Air Force Station begins operations with the launch of a Bumper rocket.
1959 – At the opening of the American National Exhibition in Moscow, U.S. Vice President Richard Nixon and Soviet Premier Nikita Khrushchev have a "Kitchen Debate".
1963 – The ship Bluenose II was launched in Lunenburg, Nova Scotia. The schooner is a major Canadian symbol.
1966 – Michael Pelkey makes the first BASE jump from El Capitan along with Brian Schubert. Both came out with broken bones. BASE jumping has now been banned from El Cap.
1967 – During an official state visit to Canada, French President Charles de Gaulle declares to a crowd of over 100,000 in Montreal: Vive le Québec libre! ("Long live free Quebec!"); the statement angered the Canadian government and many Anglophone Canadians. 
1969 – Apollo program: Apollo 11 splashes down safely in the Pacific Ocean.
1974 – Watergate scandal: The United States Supreme Court unanimously ruled that President Richard Nixon did not have the authority to withhold subpoenaed White House tapes and they order him to surrender the tapes to the Watergate special prosecutor.
1977 – End of a four-day-long Libyan–Egyptian War.
1980 – The Quietly Confident Quartet of Australia wins the men's 4 x 100 metre medley relay at the Moscow Olympics, the only time the United States has not won the event at Olympic level.
1982 – Heavy rain causes a mudslide that destroys a bridge at Nagasaki, Japan, killing 299.
1983 – The Black July anti-Tamil riots begin in Sri Lanka, killing between 400 and 3,000. Black July is generally regarded as the beginning of the Sri Lankan Civil War.
1983 – George Brett playing for the Kansas City Royals against the New York Yankees, has a game-winning home run nullified in the "Pine Tar Incident".
1987 – US supertanker  collides with mines laid by IRGC causing a 43-square-meter dent in the body of the oil tanker.
  1987   – Hulda Crooks, at 91 years of age, climbed Mt. Fuji. Crooks became the oldest person to climb Japan's highest peak. 
1998 – Russell Eugene Weston Jr. bursts into the United States Capitol and opens fire killing two police officers. He is later ruled to be incompetent to stand trial.
1999 – Air Fiji flight 121 crashes while en route to Nadi, Fiji, killing all 17 people on board.
2001 – The Bandaranaike Airport attack is carried out by 14 Tamil Tiger commandos. Eleven civilian and military aircraft are destroyed and 15 are damaged. All 14 commandos are shot dead, while seven soldiers from the Sri Lanka Air Force are killed. In addition, three civilians and an engineer die. This incident slowed the Sri Lankan economy.
2009 – Aria Air Flight 1525 crashes at Mashhad International Airport, killing 16.
2012 – Syrian civil war: The People's Protection Units (YPG) capture the city of Girkê Legê.
2014 – Air Algérie Flight 5017 loses contact with air traffic controllers 50 minutes after takeoff. It was travelling between Ouagadougou, Burkina Faso and Algiers. The wreckage is later found in Mali. All 116 people on board are killed.
2019 – Boris Johnson becomes Prime Minister of the United Kingdom after defeating Jeremy Hunt in a leadership contest, succeeding Theresa May.

Births

Pre-1600
1242 – Christina von Stommeln, German Roman Catholic mystic, ecstatic, and stigmatic (d. 1312)
1468 – Catherine of Saxony, Archduchess of Austria (d. 1524)
1529 – Charles II, Margrave of Baden-Durlach (d. 1577)
1561 – Maria of the Palatinate-Simmern (d. 1589)
1574 – Thomas Platter the Younger, Swiss physician and author (d. 1628)

1601–1900
1660 – Charles Talbot, 1st Duke of Shrewsbury, English politician, Lord High Treasurer (d. 1718)
1689 – Prince William, Duke of Gloucester, son of Queen Anne of Great Britain and Prince George of Denmark (d. 1700)
1725 – John Newton, English sailor and priest (d. 1807)
1757 – Vladimir Borovikovsky, Ukrainian-Russian painter (d. 1825)
1783 – Simón Bolívar, Venezuelan commander and politician, second President of Venezuela (d. 1830)
1786 – Joseph Nicollet, French mathematician and explorer (d. 1843)
1794 – Johan Georg Forchhammer, Danish mineralogist and geologist (d. 1865)
1802 – Alexandre Dumas, French novelist and playwright (d. 1870)
1803 – Adolphe Adam, French composer and critic (d. 1856)
  1803   – Alexander J. Davis, American architect (d. 1892)
1821 – William Poole, American boxer and gangster (d. 1855)
1826 – Jan Gotlib Bloch, Polish theorist and activist (d. 1902)
1851 – Friedrich Schottky, Polish-German mathematician and theorist (d. 1935)
1856 – Émile Picard, French mathematician and academic (d. 1941)
1857 – Henrik Pontoppidan, Danish journalist and author, Nobel Prize laureate (d. 1943)
  1857   – Juan Vicente Gómez, Venezuelan general and politician, 27th President of Venezuela (d. 1935)
1860 – Princess Charlotte of Prussia (d. 1919)
  1860   – Alphonse Mucha, Czech painter and illustrator (d. 1939)
1864 – Frank Wedekind, German actor and playwright (d. 1918)
1867 – Fred Tate, English cricketer and coach (d. 1943)
1874 – Oswald Chambers, Scottish minister and author (d. 1917)
1877 – Calogero Vizzini, Italian mob boss (d. 1954)
1878 – Edward Plunkett, 18th Baron of Dunsany, Irish author, poet, and playwright (d. 1957)
1880 – Ernest Bloch, Swiss-American composer and educator (d. 1959)
1884 – Maria Caserini, Italian actress (d. 1969)
1886 – Jun'ichirō Tanizaki, Japanese author (d. 1965)
1888 – Arthur Richardson, Australian cricketer and coach (d. 1973)
1889 – Agnes Meyer Driscoll, American cryptanalyst (d. 1971)
1895 – Robert Graves, English poet, novelist, critic (d. 1985)
1897 – Amelia Earhart, American pilot and author (d. 1937) 
1899 – Chief Dan George, Canadian actor (d. 1981)
1900 – Zelda Fitzgerald, American author, visual artist and ballet dancer (d. 1948)

1901–present
1909 – John William Finn, American lieutenant, Medal of Honor recipient (d. 2010)
1910 – Harry Horner, American director and production designer (d. 1994)
1912 – Essie Summers, New Zealand author (d. 1998)
1913 – Britton Chance, American biologist and sailor (d. 2010)
1914 – Frances Oldham Kelsey, Canadian pharmacologist and physician (d. 2015)
  1914   – Ed Mirvish, American-Canadian businessman and philanthropist (d. 2007)
  1914   – Alan Waddell, Australian walker (d. 2008)
1915 – Enrique Fernando, Filipino lawyer and jurist, 13th Chief Justice of the Supreme Court of the Philippines (d. 2004)
1916 – John D. MacDonald, American colonel and author (d. 1986)
1917 – Robert Farnon, Canadian trumpet player, composer, and conductor (d. 2005)
  1917   – Jack Moroney, Australian cricketer (d. 1999)
1918 – Ruggiero Ricci, American violinist and educator (d. 2012)
1919 – Robert Marsden Hope, Australian lawyer and judge (d. 1999)
  1919   – Kenneth S. Kleinknecht, NASA manager (d. 2007)
  1919   – John Winkin, American baseball player, coach, and journalist (d. 2014)
1920 – Bella Abzug, American lawyer and politician (d. 1998) 
  1920   – Constance Dowling, American model and actress (d. 1969)
1921 – Giuseppe Di Stefano, Italian tenor and actor (d. 2008)
  1921   – Billy Taylor, American pianist and composer (d. 2010)
1922 – Madeleine Ferron, Canadian radio host and author (d. 2010)
1924 – Wilfred Josephs, English composer (d. 1997)
  1924   – Aris Poulianos, Greek anthropologist and archaeologist
1926 – Grace Glueck, American arts journalist (d. 2022)
1927 – Alex Katz, American painter and sculptor
  1927   – Zara Mints, Russian-Estonian philologist and academic (d. 1990)
1928 – Keshubhai Patel, Indian politician, tenth Chief Minister of Gujarat (d. 2020)
1930 – Alfred Balk, American journalist and author (d. 2010)
1931 – Ermanno Olmi, Italian director, screenwriter, and cinematographer (d. 2018)
  1931   – Éric Tabarly, French commander (d. 1998)
1932 – Gustav Andreas Tammann, German astronomer and academic (d. 2019)
1933 – Doug Sanders, American golfer (d. 2020)
1934 – P. S. Soosaithasan, Sri Lankan accountant and politician (d. 2017)
1935 – Aaron Elkins, American author and academic
  1935   – Pat Oliphant, Australian cartoonist
  1935   – Mel Ramos, American painter, illustrator, and academic (d. 2018)
  1935   – Les Reed, English pianist, composer, and conductor (d. 2019)
  1935   – Derek Varnals, South African cricketer (d. 2019)
1936 – Ruth Buzzi, American actress and comedian
  1936   – Mark Goddard, American actor
1937 – Manoj Kumar, Indian actor, director, producer, and screenwriter
  1937   – Quinlan Terry, English architect, designed the Brentwood Cathedral
1938 – Alexis Jacquemin, Belgian economist and academic (d. 2004)
  1938   – Eugene J. Martin, American painter (d. 2005)
  1938   – John Sparling, New Zealand cricketer
1939 – Walt Bellamy, American basketball player and coach (d. 2013)
  1939   – David Simon, Baron Simon of Highbury, English businessman and politician
1940 – Dan Hedaya, American actor
1941 – John Bond, English banker and businessman
1942 – Heinz, German-English singer-songwriter and bass player (d. 2000)
  1942   – David Miner, American singer-songwriter, guitarist, and producer 
  1942   – Chris Sarandon, American actor
1944 – Jim Armstrong, Northern Irish guitarist 
1945 – Frank Close, English physicist and academic
  1945   – Azim Premji, Indian businessman and philanthropist
  1945   – Hugh Ross, Canadian-American astrophysicist and astronomer 
  1945   – Anthony Watts, English geologist, geophysicist, and academic
1946 – Gallagher, American comedian and actor
  1946   – Friedhelm Haebermann, German footballer and manager
  1946   – Hervé Vilard, French singer-songwriter
1947 – Zaheer Abbas, Pakistani cricketer and manager
  1947   – Peter Serkin, American pianist and educator (d. 2020)
1949 – Michael Richards, American actor and comedian 
1950 – Jadranka Stojaković, Yugoslav singer-songwriter (d. 2016)
1951 – Lynda Carter, American actress 
  1951   – Chris Smith, Baron Smith of Finsbury, English politician, Secretary of State for Culture, Media and Sport
1952 – Ian Cairns, Australian surfer
  1952   – Gus Van Sant, American director, producer, and screenwriter
1953 – Jon Faddis, American trumpet player, composer, and conductor
  1953   – Tadashi Kawamata, Japanese contemporary artist
  1953   – Claire McCaskill, American lawyer and politician
  1953   – James Newcome, English bishop
1954 – Erdoğan Arıca, Turkish footballer and manager (d. 2012)
  1954   – Jorge Jesus, Portuguese footballer and manager 
1956 – Charlie Crist, American lawyer and politician, 44th Governor of Florida
1957 – Pam Tillis, American singer-songwriter, guitarist, and actress
1958 – Jim Leighton, Scottish footballer and coach
1960 – Catherine Destivelle, French rock climber and mountaineer
1961 – Kerry Dixon, English footballer and manager
1962 – Johnny O'Connell, American race car driver and sportscaster
1963 – Louis Armary, French rugby player
  1963   – Karl Malone, American basketball player and coach
1964 – Barry Bonds, American baseball player
  1964   – Pedro Passos Coelho, Portuguese economist and politician, 118th Prime Minister of Portugal
  1964   – Urmas Kaljend, Estonian footballer
1965 – Andrew Gaze, Australian basketball player and sportscaster
  1965   – Kadeem Hardison, American actor, director, and screenwriter
1966 – Mo-Do, Italian singer-songwriter (d. 2013)
  1966   – Aminatou Haidar, Sahrawi human rights activist
  1966   – Martin Keown, English footballer and coach
1968 – Kristin Chenoweth, American actress and singer
  1968   – Malcolm Ingram, Canadian director, producer, and screenwriter
1969 – Rick Fox, Bahamian basketball player 
  1969   – Jennifer Lopez, American actress, singer, and dancer
1971 – Dino Baggio, Italian footballer
  1971   – Patty Jenkins, American film director and screenwriter
1972 – Kaiō Hiroyuki, Japanese sumo wrestler
1973 – Russell Bawden, Australian rugby league player
  1973   – Ana Cristina Oliveira, Portuguese model and actress
  1973   – Amanda Stretton, English racing driver and journalist
1974 – Andy Gomarsall, English rugby player
1975 – Tracey Crouch, English politician, Minister for Sport and the Olympics
  1975   – Jamie Langenbrunner, American ice hockey player
  1975   – Torrie Wilson, American model, fitness competitor, actress and professional wrestler
1976 – Rafer Alston, American basketball player
  1976   – Tiago Monteiro, Portuguese racing driver and manager
1978 – Andy Irons, American surfer (d. 2010)
1979 – Rose Byrne, Australian actress 
  1979   – Jerrod Niemann, American singer-songwriter and guitarist
  1979   – Valerio Scassellati, Italian racing driver
  1979   – Anne-Gaëlle Sidot, French tennis player
  1979   – Mark Andrew Smith, American author 
  1979   – Ryan Speier, American baseball player
  1980   – Joel Stroetzel, American guitarist 
1981 – Doug Bollinger, Australian cricketer 
  1981   – Nayib Bukele, Salvadoran politician, 46th President of El Salvador
  1981   – Summer Glau, American actress
  1981   – Mark Robinson, English footballer
1982 – Trevor Matthews, Canadian actor and producer, founded Brookstreet Pictures
  1982   – Thiago Medeiros, Brazilian racing driver
  1982   – Mewelde Moore, American football player
  1982   – Elisabeth Moss, American actress
  1982   – Anna Paquin, Canadian-New Zealand actress
  1982   – Michael Poppmeier, South African-German rugby player
1983 – Daniele De Rossi, Italian footballer
  1983   – Asami Mizukawa, Japanese actress
1984 – Patrick Harvey, Australian actor
  1984   – Tyler Kyte, Canadian singer and drummer
1985 – Patrice Bergeron, Canadian ice hockey player
  1985   – Aries Merritt, American hurdler 
  1985   – Lukáš Rosol, Czech tennis player
  1985   – Eric Wright, American football player
1986 – Natalie Tran, Australian actress and online producer
1987 – Filipe Francisco dos Santos, Brazilian footballer
  1987   – Nathan Gerbe, American ice hockey player
  1987   – Zack Sabre Jr., English wrestler
1988 – Han Seung-yeon, South Korean singer and dancer
  1988   – Nichkhun, Thai-American singer-songwriter and actor
  1988   – Ricky Petterd, Australian footballer
1989 – Maurkice Pouncey, American football player
  1989   – Kim Tae-hwan, South Korean footballer
1990 – Travis Mahoney, Australian swimmer
1991 – Emily Bett Rickards, Canadian actress
1992 – Mikaël Kingsbury, Canadian skier
1994 – Phillip Lindsay, American football player
1995 – Valentine Holmes, Australian rugby league player
  1995   – Kyle Kuzma, American basketball player
  1995   – Meisei Chikara, Japanese sumo wrestler
1998 – Bindi Irwin, Australian conservationist, zookeeper, and actress
2002 – Nicole Pircio, Brazilian rhythmic gymnast

Deaths

Pre-1600
 759 – Oswulf, king of Northumbria
 811 – Gao Ying, Chinese politician (b. 740)
 946 – Muhammad ibn Tughj al-Ikhshid, Egyptian ruler (b. 882)
1115 – Matilda of Tuscany (b. 1046)
1129 – Emperor Shirakawa of Japan (b. 1053)
1198 – Berthold of Hanover, Bishop of Livonia
1345 – Jacob van Artevelde, Flemish statesman (b. 1290)
1568 – Carlos, Prince of Asturias (b. 1545)
1594 – John Boste, English martyr and saint (b. 1544)

1601–1900
1601 – Joris Hoefnagel, Flemish painter (b. 1542)
1612 – John Salusbury, Welsh politician and poet (b. 1567)
1739 – Benedetto Marcello, Italian composer and educator (b. 1686)
1768 – Nathaniel Lardner, English theologian and author (b. 1684)
1862 – Martin Van Buren, American lawyer and politician, eighth President of the United States (b. 1782)
1891 – Hermann Raster, German-American journalist and politician (b. 1827)

1901–present
1908 – Vicente Acosta, Salvadoran journalist and poet (b. 1867)
  1908   – Sigismondo Savona, Maltese educator and politician (b. 1835)
1910 – Arkhip Kuindzhi, Ukrainian-Russian painter (b. 1841)
1927 – Ryūnosuke Akutagawa, Japanese author (b. 1892)
1957 – Sacha Guitry, French actor and director (b. 1885)
1962 – Wilfrid Noyce, English mountaineer and author (b. 1917)
1965 – Constance Bennett, American actress and producer (b. 1904)
1966 – Tony Lema, American golfer (b. 1934)
1969 – Witold Gombrowicz, Polish author and playwright (b. 1904)
1970 – Peter de Noronha, Indian businessman, philanthropist, and civil servant (b. 1897)
1974 – James Chadwick, English physicist and academic, Nobel Prize laureate (b. 1891)
1980 – Peter Sellers, English actor and comedian (b. 1925)
1985 – Ezechiele Ramin, Italian missionary and martyr (b. 1953)
1986 – Fritz Albert Lipmann, German-American biochemist and academic, Nobel Prize laureate (b. 1899)
  1986   – Qudrat Ullah Shahab, Pakistani civil servant and author (b. 1917) 
1991 – Isaac Bashevis Singer, Polish-American novelist and short story writer, Nobel Prize laureate (b. 1902)
1992 – Arletty, French actress and singer (b. 1898)
  1992   – Sam Berger, Canadian lawyer and businessman (b. 1900)
1994 – Helen Cordero, Cochiti Pueblo (Native American) Pueblo potter (b. 1915)
1995 – George Rodger, English photographer and journalist (b. 1908)
1996 – Alphonso Theodore Roberts, Vincentian cricketer and activist (b. 1937)
1997 – William J. Brennan Jr., American colonel and jurist (b. 1906)
  1997   – Saw Maung, Burmese general and politician, seventh Prime Minister of Burma (b. 1928)
2000 – Ahmad Shamloo, Iranian poet and journalist (b. 1925)
2001 – Georges Dor, Canadian author, playwright, and composer (b. 1931)
2005 – Richard Doll, English physiologist and epidemiologist (b. 1912)
2007 – Albert Ellis, American psychologist and author (b. 1913)
  2007   – Nicola Zaccaria, Greek opera singer (b. 1923)
2008 – Norman Dello Joio, American pianist and composer (b. 1913)
2010 – Alex Higgins, Northern Irish snooker player (b. 1949)
2011 – Frank Dietrich, German politician (b. 1966)
  2011   – Dan Peek, American singer-songwriter and guitarist  (b. 1950)	
  2011   – Harald Johnsen, Norwegian bassist and composer (b. 1970)
  2011   – David Servan-Schreiber, French physician, neuroscientist, and author (b. 1961)
  2011   – Skip Thomas, American football player (b. 1950)
2012 – Chad Everett, American actor and director (b. 1937)
  2012   – Sherman Hemsley, American actor and singer (b. 1938)
  2012   – Larry Hoppen, American singer and guitarist (b. 1951)
  2012   – Robert Ledley, American physiologist and physicist, invented the CT scanner (b. 1926) 
  2012   – Themo Lobos, Chilean author and illustrator (b. 1928)
  2012   – John Atta Mills, Ghanaian lawyer and politician, President of Ghana (b. 1944)
  2012   – Gregorio Peces-Barba, Spanish jurist and politician (b. 1938)
2013 – Garry Davis, American pilot and activist, created the World Passport (b. 1921)
  2013   – Fred Dretske, American philosopher and academic (b. 1932)
  2013   – Virginia E. Johnson, American psychologist and sexologist (b. 1925)
  2013   – Pius Langa, South African lawyer and jurist, 19th Chief Justice of South Africa (b. 1939)
2014 – Ik-Hwan Bae, Korean-American violinist and educator (b. 1956)
  2014   – Dale Schlueter, American basketball player (b. 1945)
  2014   – Hans-Hermann Sprado, German journalist and author (b. 1956)
2015 – Peg Lynch, American actress and screenwriter (b. 1916)
  2015   – Ingrid Sischy, South African-American journalist and critic (b. 1952)
2016 – Marni Nixon, American actress and singer (b. 1930)
2017 – Harshida Raval, Indian Gujarati playback singer
2020 – Regis Philbin, American actor and television host (b. 1931)
2021 – Dale Snodgrass, United States Naval Aviator and air show performer (b. 1949) 
2022 – David Warner, English actor (b. 1941)

Holidays and observances
Carnival of Awussu (Tunisia)
Children's Day (Vanuatu)
Christian feast day:
Charbel (Maronite Church/Catholic Church)
Christina the Astonishing
Christina of Bolsena
Declán of Ardmore
John Boste
Kinga (or Cunegunda) of Poland
Martyrs of Daimiel
Menefrida of Cornwall 
Sigolena of Albi
July 24 (Eastern Orthodox liturgics)
Pioneer Day (Utah) 
Police Day (Poland)
Simón Bolívar Day (Ecuador, Venezuela, Colombia, and Bolivia)
Navy Day (Venezuela)

References

External links

 
 
 

Days of the year
July